Wang Xianbo (born August 28, 1976) is a Chinese judoka and Olympic medalist. She competed at the 1996 Summer Olympics in Atlanta, winning a bronze medal in judo (middleweight class).

References

External links

1976 births
Living people
Chinese female judoka
Olympic judoka of China
Olympic bronze medalists for China
Judoka at the 1996 Summer Olympics
Olympic medalists in judo
Asian Games medalists in judo
Judoka at the 1998 Asian Games
Asian Games gold medalists for China
Medalists at the 1998 Asian Games
Medalists at the 1996 Summer Olympics
20th-century Chinese women
21st-century Chinese women